Andrea Fattizzo (born January 29, 1975, in Italy, Southern Europe) is a retired Italian footballer. He played as a defender. He made his debut with U.S. Lecce in Serie A on September 5, 1993, against Parma. The following year, he played two matches in Serie B against Atlanta and Palermo. He then played for many Serie C and Serie D teams.

Career
1992-1995  Lecce 3 (0) 
1995-1999  Toma Maglie 92 (7) 
1999-2000  Palermo 5 (0) 
2000  Lanciano  14 (0) 
2000-2001  Chieti  18 (0) 
2001  Giugliano 11 (0) 
2001-2002  Tricase 28 (2) 
2002-2003  Frosinone 14 (0) 
2002-2003  Sassuolo 11 (1) 
2003-2004  Cosenza  20 (0) 
2004-2005  Nardò  19 (0)

References

External links
 WLecce.it - Archivio

Living people
1975 births
People from Zofingen
Italian footballers
Association football defenders
U.S. Lecce players